Andrew J. Byrne (1802 – June 10, 1862) was an Irish-born American Catholic priest, who became the first bishop of the Diocese of Little Rock in Arkansas from 1844 until his death in 1862.

Biography

Early life 
Andrew Byrne was born in 1802 in Navan, County Meath, in Ireland, the son of Robert and Margery Moore Byrne. Baptized on December 3, 1802, he was possibly born on  November 30. While studying at St. Finian's College in Navan, Byrne was recruited in 1820 by Bishop John England to immigrate to the United States and serve in the new   Diocese of Charleston in South Carolina.

Priesthood 
Byrne was ordained by Bishop England for the Diocese of Charleston, on November 11, 1827.  After a period of missionary work in South Carolina and North Carolina, he was appointed pastor of St. Mary's Parish in Charleston. Byrne was eventually named vicar-general of the diocese. At the Second Baltimore Council in Baltimore, Maryland, in 1833, he acted as Bishop England's theologian.

In 1836, Byrne was incardinated, or transferred, to the Diocese of New York, in New York City, where he served at St. Patrick's Parish, and St. James's Parish, both in Manhattan.  In 1841, bishop John Hughes sent him to Ireland to recruit the Christian Brothers to teach in the diocesan schools. When local Catholics had purchased the former Universalist Church known as Carroll Hall, Byrne founded St. Andrew Parish there, which Hughes dedicated on March 19, 1842. Byrne also organized the Church of the Nativity Parish on 2nd Avenue, which Hughes dedicated on June 5, 1842.

Bishop of Little Rock 
On November 28, 1843, Byrne was appointed bishop of the new Diocese of Little Rock by  He was consecrated in St. Patrick's Cathedral in New York City on March 10, 1844, by Bishop Hughes.

When Byrne arrived in Arkansas, his diocese had approximately 700 Catholics, with four priests and four churches. He brought two priest with him, and together they established St. Ambrose Church at Arkansas Post, Arkansas and the Cathedral of St. Andrew in Little Rock in about a year. Other parishes were established at Pine Bluff and New Gascony, Arkansas. Byrne visited Ireland twice to obtain assistants. He persuaded the Sisters of Mercy to come to his newly established diocese. Four sisters and five postulants arrived in 1851 and established a school in Little Rock that would later become Mount St. Mary Academy. They also opened convent schools at Fort Smith and Helena. 

A fire of suspicious origin destroyed the church in Helena in 1854, as the Know Nothings’ influence grew. Byrne avoided political issues, including that of slavery.  The record shows that he was not a slave owner, but did not express any sentiments regarding the issue. Byrne attended the Sixth Provincial Council of Baltimore in May, 1846, and the First Provincial Council of New Orleans in 1856.

By Byrne's death, the diocese had grown to include nine priests, 13 churches, 30 stations, and 12 schools and academies, and had almost completed arrangements for the starting of a college at Fort Smith by the Congregation of Christian Brothers.

Andrew Byrne died on June 10, 1862, in Helena, Arkansas at age 59.

References

Sources
Catholic Almanac (Baltimore, 1864); 
John Gilmary Shea, The Catholic Church in N. Y. City (New York, 1878); 
Clarke, Lives of the Deceased Bishops (New York, 1872); 
Bayley, Brief Sketch of the Early History of the Catholic Church on the Island of New York (New York, 1870)

1802 births
1862 deaths
19th-century Irish Roman Catholic priests
People from Navan
People educated at St Finian's College
Irish emigrants to the United States (before 1923)
Roman Catholic bishops of Little Rock
American Roman Catholic clergy of Irish descent
19th-century Roman Catholic bishops in the United States